Visual Karma (Body, Mind and Soul) is the first live album by Italian gothic metal band Lacuna Coil, that was released in November 2008. The DVD is retrospective of all things from the band's "Karmacode" album cycle, the set features concerts filmed at Germany's Wacken Festival and at the Japanese Loudpark Festival in 2007. It includes a lot of extras like promo videos and Behind-the-scenes.

The DVD was released in 2 disc Standard Edition and 4 Disc Limited Edition (Europe only) that includes a 5.1 mix of the "Karmacode" album on DVD Audio and a bonus CD with the Wacken Open Air audio live material.

Promotion
In November and December 2008, Lacuna Coil toured in Europe as the main support for act Bullet for my Valentine, with Bleeding Through and Black Tide also supporting. After the cancellation of their first headline tour in Australia, the band announced their participation at the Soundwave festival 2009 in February.

Track listing

Limited Edition 
DVD Audio:

 "Fragile"
 "To the Edge"
 "Our Truth"
 "Within Me"
 "Devoted"
 "You Create"
 "What I See"
 "Fragments of Faith"
 "Closer"
 "In Visible Light"
 "The Game"
 "Without Fear"
 "Enjoy the Silence"
 "Without a Reason (bonus song from the Our Truth single)"
 "Virtual Environment (bonus song from the Enjoy the Silence single)"

CD:
 "Intro / To the Edge"
 "Fragments of Faith"
 "Swamped"
 "In Visible Light"
 "Fragile"
 "Closer"
 "Senzafine"
 "What I See"
 "Enjoy the Silence"
 "Heaven's a Lie"
 "Our Truth"

iTunes Digital Download/Amazon MP3
 "Intro / To the Edge"
 "Fragments of Faith"
 "Swamped"
 "In Visible Light"
 "Fragile"
 "Closer"
 "Senzafine"
 "What I See"
 "Enjoy the Silence"
 "Heaven's a Lie"
 "Our Truth"

Release history

References

External links
Official site
Century Media Web Site

Lacuna Coil albums
2008 video albums
Live video albums
2008 live albums
EMI Records live albums
EMI Records video albums